Bert Schiettecatte (born January 1, 1979) is a Belgian entrepreneur who created the Audiocubes.

Biography

Bert Schiettecatte was born in Ghent, Belgium. He has an electronic music production background . He holds an MSc in computer science from the University of Brussels (VUB) and an MA/MST of Arts in Music, Science and Technology from CCRMA, a department at Stanford University (BAEF grant).

While studying at CCRMA, Bert Schiettecatte developed a strong interest in hardware engineering, electronics, and human-computer interaction. Together with Eto Otitigbe and Luigi Castelli, Bert Schiettecatte created a customized dance pad and a laser harp (such as the one of Jean-Michel Jarre), at CCRMA.

After taking several research positions, Bert founded his company Percussa in 2004 to develop tangible user interface technology for music making. Percussa's first product, Audiocubes, was launched in January 2007.

Awards
2009: he received the  Qwartz Max Mathews award for the invention of the Audiocubes
2010: he was invited to give a talk at TEDx Mediterranean in Cannes.

Publications

References

1979 births
Living people
Electronics engineers
Stanford University alumni
Audio engineering